The six string quartets, K. 155–160, were composed by Wolfgang Amadeus Mozart in late 1772 and early 1773 when Mozart was sixteen and seventeen years of age.  Because they were composed in Milan while he was working on his opera Lucio Silla, they are popularly known as the Milanese Quartets.  Before this set was composed, Mozart had written one earlier string quartet (K. 80/73f in 1770), so these six quartets are ordinally numbered from No. 2 to No. 7.  The quartets are written in a plan of keys of D-G-C-F-B-E following the circle of fifths.

All six quartets have only three movements.  Four of the quartets (K. 156-159) have middle movements in the minor mode, one of which (that of K. 159) is, unusually, not a slow movement, but a fiery sonata-allegro. The finales are generally lightweight, usually minuets or rondos.

The sixth edition of the Köchel catalogue, published in 1964, amended the catalogue numbers of the first two quartets to K. 134a and 134b, respectively, and the last quartet to K. 159a.

The Six Milanese Quartets

Quartet No. 2 in D major, K. 155 (K. 134a)

Written in the autumn of 1772 in Bolzano.
Allegro
Andante
Molto allegro

Quartet No. 3 in G major, K. 156 (K. 134b)
Written at the end of 1772 in Milan.

Presto
Adagio
Tempo di minuetto

Quartet No. 4 in C major, K. 157
Written at the end of 1772 in Milan and premiered in early 1773.
  
Allegro
Andante
Presto

Quartet No. 5 in F major, K. 158
Written and premiered in early 1773 in Milan.
 
Allegro
Andante un poco allegretto
Tempo di minuetto

Quartet No. 6 in B flat major, K. 159
Written and premiered in early 1773 in Milan.
   
Andante
Allegro
Rondo

Quartet No. 7 in E flat major, K. 160 (K. 159a)
Written and premiered in early 1773 in Milan.  The second movement is remarkable for its non-tonic opening .

Allegro
Un poco adagio
Presto

Notes

External links

String quartets by Wolfgang Amadeus Mozart
1772 compositions
1773 compositions